The 1804 United States presidential election was the fifth quadrennial presidential election, held from Friday, November 2, to Wednesday, December 5, 1804. Incumbent Democratic-Republican president Thomas Jefferson defeated Federalist Charles Cotesworth Pinckney of South Carolina. It was the first presidential election conducted following the ratification of the Twelfth Amendment to the United States Constitution, which reformed procedures for electing presidents and vice presidents.

Jefferson was re-nominated by his party's congressional nominating caucus without opposition, and the party nominated Governor George Clinton of New York to replace Aaron Burr as Jefferson's running mate. With former president John Adams in retirement, the Federalists turned to Pinckney, a former ambassador and Revolutionary War hero who had been Adams's running mate in the 1800 election.

Though Jefferson had only narrowly defeated Adams in 1800, he was widely popular due to the Louisiana Purchase and a strong economy. He carried almost every state, including most states in the Federalist stronghold of New England.

Background
Although the 1800 presidential election was a close one, Jefferson steadily gained popularity during his term. American trade boomed due to the temporary suspension of hostilities during the French Revolutionary Wars in Europe, and the Louisiana Purchase was heralded as a great achievement.

Nominations

Democratic-Republican Party nomination

The congressional nominating caucus of the Democratic-Republican Party was held in February 1804, with 108 members of the United States Congress in attendance and Senator Stephen R. Bradley as its chair. Jefferson was renominated by acclamation while Vice President Aaron Burr was not considered for renomination. The caucus selected to give the vice-presidential nomination to Governor George Clinton whose main opponent was Senator John Breckinridge. A thirteen member committee was selected to manage Jefferson's presidential campaign.

Vice-presidential candidates
 John Breckinridge (Kentucky), U.S. Senator
 George Clinton (New York), Governor
 Gideon Granger (Connecticut), Postmaster General
 John Langdon (New Hampshire), former U.S. Senator
 Levi Lincoln (Massachusetts), U.S. Attorney General
 William Maclay (Pennsylvania), former U.S. Senator

Balloting

Federalist Party nomination

The Federalists did not hold a nominating caucus, but Federalist Congressional leaders informally agreed to nominate a ticket consisting of Charles Cotesworth Pinckney of South Carolina and former Senator Rufus King of New York. Pinckney's public service during and after the American Revolutionary War had won him national stature, and Federalists hoped that Pinckney would win some Southern votes away from Jefferson, who had dominated the Southern vote in the previous election.

General election
Federalist leader Alexander Hamilton's death in July 1804 following the Burr–Hamilton duel destroyed whatever hope the Federalists had of defeating the popular Jefferson. Leaderless and disorganized, the Federalists failed to attract much support outside of New England. The Federalists attacked the Louisiana Purchase as unconstitutional, criticized Jefferson's gunboat navy, and alleged that Jefferson had fathered children with his slave, Sally Hemings, but the party failed to galvanize opposition to Jefferson. Jefferson's policies of expansionism and reduced government spending were widely popular. Jefferson was aided by an effective Democratic-Republican party organization, which had continued to develop since 1800, especially in the Federalist stronghold of New England.

Jefferson's victory was overwhelming, and he even won four of the five New England states. Pinckney won only two states, Connecticut and Delaware. This was the first election where the Democratic-Republicans won in Maryland, Massachusetts, New Hampshire, and Rhode Island.

As of 2020, Jefferson was the first of seven presidential nominees to win a significant number of electoral votes in at least three elections, the others being Henry Clay, Andrew Jackson, Grover Cleveland, William Jennings Bryan, Franklin D. Roosevelt, and Richard Nixon. Of these, Jackson, Cleveland, and Roosevelt also won the popular vote in at least three elections.

Results

Source (Popular Vote): A New Nation Votes: American Election Returns 1787-1825Source (electoral vote): 

(a) Only 11 of the 17 states chose electors by popular vote.(b) Those states that did choose electors by popular vote had widely varying restrictions on suffrage via property requirements.''

Popular vote by state 
The popular vote totals used are the elector from each party with the highest total of votes.  The vote totals of North Carolina and Tennessee appear to be incomplete.

Close states 

States where the margin of victory was under 5%:
 New Hampshire, 4.02% (702 votes)

States where the margin of victory was under 10%:
 Massachusetts, 7.16% (3,955 votes)

Electoral College selection

See also
 Bibliography of Thomas Jefferson
 History of the United States (1789–1849)
 Second inauguration of Thomas Jefferson
 1804–05 United States House of Representatives elections
 1804–05 United States Senate elections

References

 
 A New Nation Votes: American Election Returns 1787-1825
 Presidential Election of 1804: A Resource Guide from the Library of Congress

External links 

 Election of 1804 in Counting the Votes 

 
Presidency of Thomas Jefferson
Thomas Jefferson